Moscow City Duma District 8 is one of 45 constituencies in Moscow City Duma. The constituency has covered parts of Northern Moscow since 2014. From 1993-2005 District 8 was based in North-Eastern Moscow; from 2005-2014 the constituency was based in South-Eastern Moscow (it actually overlapped the entirety of State Duma Avtozavodsky constituency in 2005-2009).

Members elected

Election results

2001

|-
! colspan=2 style="background-color:#E9E9E9;text-align:left;vertical-align:top;" |Candidate
! style="background-color:#E9E9E9;text-align:left;vertical-align:top;" |Party
! style="background-color:#E9E9E9;text-align:right;" |Votes
! style="background-color:#E9E9E9;text-align:right;" |%
|-
|style="background-color:"|
|align=left|Vladimir Vasilyev (incumbent)
|align=left|Independent
|
|60.67%
|-
|style="background-color:"|
|align=left|Svetlana Kukushkina
|align=left|Independent
|
|14.57%
|-
|style="background-color:"|
|align=left|Anna Lisichkina
|align=left|Independent
|
|7.72%
|-
|style="background-color:#000000"|
|colspan=2 |against all
|
|13.23%
|-
| colspan="5" style="background-color:#E9E9E9;"|
|- style="font-weight:bold"
| colspan="3" style="text-align:left;" | Total
| 
| 100%
|-
| colspan="5" style="background-color:#E9E9E9;"|
|- style="font-weight:bold"
| colspan="4" |Source:
|
|}

2004

|-
! colspan=2 style="background-color:#E9E9E9;text-align:left;vertical-align:top;" |Candidate
! style="background-color:#E9E9E9;text-align:left;vertical-align:top;" |Party
! style="background-color:#E9E9E9;text-align:right;" |Votes
! style="background-color:#E9E9E9;text-align:right;" |%
|-
|style="background-color:"|
|align=left|Valery Shaposhnikov
|align=left|United Russia
|
|42.22%
|-
|style="background-color:"|
|align=left|Nikolay Zubrilin
|align=left|Communist Party
|
|10.51%
|-
|style="background-color:"|
|align=left|Aleksandr Chelishchev
|align=left|Independent
|
|7.79%
|-
|style="background-color:"|
|align=left|Anatoly Alekseyev
|align=left|Liberal Democratic Party
|
|4.63%
|-
|style="background-color:"|
|align=left|Gennady Belinsky
|align=left|Independent
|
|3.84%
|-
|style="background-color:#000000"|
|colspan=2 |against all
|
|28.70%
|-
| colspan="5" style="background-color:#E9E9E9;"|
|- style="font-weight:bold"
| colspan="3" style="text-align:left;" | Total
| 
| 100%
|-
| colspan="5" style="background-color:#E9E9E9;"|
|- style="font-weight:bold"
| colspan="4" |Source:
|
|}

2005

|-
! colspan=2 style="background-color:#E9E9E9;text-align:left;vertical-align:top;" |Candidate
! style="background-color:#E9E9E9;text-align:left;vertical-align:top;" |Party
! style="background-color:#E9E9E9;text-align:right;" |Votes
! style="background-color:#E9E9E9;text-align:right;" |%
|-
|style="background-color:"|
|align=left|Mikhail Antontsev (incumbent)
|align=left|United Russia
|
|49.64%
|-
|style="background-color:"|
|align=left|Anatoly Zhigalov
|align=left|Communist Party
|
|14.85%
|-
|style="background-color:"|
|align=left|Vladislav Yashkin
|align=left|Rodina
|
|14.08%
|-
|style="background-color:"|
|align=left|Yury Kaminsky
|align=left|Liberal Democratic Party
|
|9.94%
|-
|style="background-color:"|
|align=left|Vladimir Popov
|align=left|Independent
|
|4.18%
|-
| colspan="5" style="background-color:#E9E9E9;"|
|- style="font-weight:bold"
| colspan="3" style="text-align:left;" | Total
| 
| 100%
|-
| colspan="5" style="background-color:#E9E9E9;"|
|- style="font-weight:bold"
| colspan="4" |Source:
|
|}

2009

|-
! colspan=2 style="background-color:#E9E9E9;text-align:left;vertical-align:top;" |Candidate
! style="background-color:#E9E9E9;text-align:left;vertical-align:top;" |Party
! style="background-color:#E9E9E9;text-align:right;" |Votes
! style="background-color:#E9E9E9;text-align:right;" |%
|-
|style="background-color:"|
|align=left|Lyudmila Stebenkova
|align=left|United Russia
|
|68.69%
|-
|style="background-color:"|
|align=left|Anatoly Turenko
|align=left|Communist Party
|
|12.06%
|-
|style="background-color:"|
|align=left|Maksim Govorin
|align=left|Liberal Democratic Party
|
|7.65%
|-
|style="background-color:"|
|align=left|Aleksandr Kuvayev
|align=left|A Just Russia
|
|7.26%
|-
| colspan="5" style="background-color:#E9E9E9;"|
|- style="font-weight:bold"
| colspan="3" style="text-align:left;" | Total
| 
| 100%
|-
| colspan="5" style="background-color:#E9E9E9;"|
|- style="font-weight:bold"
| colspan="4" |Source:
|
|}

2014

|-
! colspan=2 style="background-color:#E9E9E9;text-align:left;vertical-align:top;" |Candidate
! style="background-color:#E9E9E9;text-align:left;vertical-align:top;" |Party
! style="background-color:#E9E9E9;text-align:right;" |Votes
! style="background-color:#E9E9E9;text-align:right;" |%
|-
|style="background-color:"|
|align=left|Leonid Zyuganov
|align=left|Communist Party
|
|33.47%
|-
|style="background-color:"|
|align=left|Igor Nikolayev
|align=left|Yabloko
|
|20.23%
|-
|style="background-color:"|
|align=left|Anton Morozov
|align=left|Independent
|
|16.47%
|-
|style="background-color:"|
|align=left|Oleg Belyayev
|align=left|A Just Russia
|
|11.37%
|-
|style="background-color:"|
|align=left|Tatyana Fateyeva
|align=left|Liberal Democratic Party
|
|9.41%
|-
|style="background: #00A650"| 
|align=left|Lilia Yunusova
|align=left|Civilian Power
|
|5.22%
|-
| colspan="5" style="background-color:#E9E9E9;"|
|- style="font-weight:bold"
| colspan="3" style="text-align:left;" | Total
| 
| 100%
|-
| colspan="5" style="background-color:#E9E9E9;"|
|- style="font-weight:bold"
| colspan="4" |Source:
|
|}

2019

|-
! colspan=2 style="background-color:#E9E9E9;text-align:left;vertical-align:top;" |Candidate
! style="background-color:#E9E9E9;text-align:left;vertical-align:top;" |Party
! style="background-color:#E9E9E9;text-align:right;" |Votes
! style="background-color:#E9E9E9;text-align:right;" |%
|-
|style="background-color:"|
|align=left|Darya Besedina
|align=left|Independent
|
|36.57%
|-
|style="background-color:"|
|align=left|Vadim Kumin
|align=left|Communist Party
|
|31.41%
|-
|style="background-color:"|
|align=left|Olga Panina
|align=left|A Just Russia
|
|14.16%
|-
|style="background-color:"|
|align=left|Yekaterina Kopeykina
|align=left|Independent
|
|6.78%
|-
|style="background-color:"|
|align=left|Vasily Vlasov
|align=left|Liberal Democratic Party
|
|5.28%
|-
|style="background-color:"|
|align=left|Yelena Lugovskaya
|align=left|Party of Growth
|
|3.07%
|-
| colspan="5" style="background-color:#E9E9E9;"|
|- style="font-weight:bold"
| colspan="3" style="text-align:left;" | Total
| 
| 100%
|-
| colspan="5" style="background-color:#E9E9E9;"|
|- style="font-weight:bold"
| colspan="4" |Source:
|
|}

Notes

References

Moscow City Duma districts